The Afon Mawddach is a river in Gwynedd, Wales, which has its source in a wide area  north of Dduallt in Snowdonia. It is 28 miles (45 km) in length, and is much branched; many of the significant tributaries are of a similar size to the main river. The catchment area is bounded to the east by the Aran Fawddwy massif and to the west and north by the Harlech dome which  forms a watershed just south of Llyn Trawsfynydd.

The Mawddach has been the site of significant industrialisation and land management. Gold mining and subsequently gold panning have had major impacts but forestry, the preparation of animal skins, the storage of old munitions and the use of hill-sides as artillery ranges have all added to the legacy of pollution. The river is also very flashy - prone to very rapid rise and fall in level depending on rainfall. Rainfall can also be very heavy and it falls on very base-poor soils leading to episodes of strongly depressed pH. Despite this, the river sustains an important salmon and trout fishery and the countryside through which it flows is some of the most spectacular and scenic in the UK.

The main tributaries starting in the west and working clockwise are:
Afon Cwm Mynach which drains Llyn Cwm Mynach on the Rhinogydd.
Afon Gamlan which joins at Ganllwyd after following a tumultuous valley through ancient oak woods before descending towards the main river down Rhaeadr Ddu (Black waterfalls). This valley has one of the more important moss and liverwort communities in the southern UK.
Afon Eden - its headwaters known as Afon Crawcwellt - a large tributary draining from below Llyn Trawsfynydd and closely following the A470 through the Coed-y-Brenin forest. This tributary has been severely affected by industrialisation in the past, including gold mining and its use as an ordnance range.
Afon Gain, a large tributary which has also been impacted by similar problems to the Eden and is very acidic and peaty.
Afon Wen which joins south of the Gain is similar but smaller.
Afon Wnion is a major tributary joining from the east and which drains a large area out towards Aran Fawddwy

Estuary
Below Dolgellau the river enters a wide and sandy estuary of great beauty. The head of the estuary is marked by the confluence of the Mawddach and Wnion. At its mouth is the town of Barmouth and its railway bridge.

Geology 
The Mawddach estuary was formed from a glaciated valley which was flooded by the sea during the Holocene glacial retreat to form a fjord.

Human history 
The southern bank of the Mawddach estuary, along which used to run a section of the GWR branch line from Ruabon to Barmouth, has now been designated the Mawddach Trail, an 8-mile cycle path running from Dolgellau to Morfa Mawddach, at the south side of the Barmouth railway bridge. It is managed by the Snowdonia National Park Authority as a leisure route for walkers and cyclists, and is part of the Sustrans Cross-Wales Cycling Route.

The estuary of the Mawddach was a great centre of ship building in the 18th century and probably for some centuries before. There is no evidence remaining of this activity in the estuary today.

References

External links 

 River Mawddach panorama
 Aerial photograph of Cadair Idris and the river Mawddach
 Mawddach Trail
 The Mawddach Trail - The 'Railway Walk' between Dolgellau and Barmouth
 The Mawddach Way: A 50km Circular Walk around the Mawddach Estuary
 Mawddachestuary.co.uk - Events and Activities along the Mawddach Estuary
 PhD thesis: An integrated Meteorological/Hydrological Model for the Mawddach Catchment. Graham Hall, Bangor University

Mawddach
Mawddach